Eva Lindh (born 1971) is a Swedish politician.  she serves as Member of the Riksdag representing the constituency of Östergötland County.

She served as substitute member of the Riksdag when both Johan Löfstrand and Teresa Carvalho were on parental leave.

She was also elected as Member of the Riksdag in September 2022.

References 

Living people
1971 births
Place of birth missing (living people)
21st-century Swedish politicians
21st-century Swedish women politicians
Members of the Riksdag 2018–2022
Members of the Riksdag 2022–2026
Members of the Riksdag from the Social Democrats
Women members of the Riksdag